The Romblon Province false gecko (Pseudogekko isapa) is a species of gecko. It is endemic to the Philippines.

References 

Pseudogekko
Reptiles described in 2016
Reptiles of the Philippines